Claudia Schmidt may refer to:

 Claudia Schmidt (musician) (born 1953), American musician
 Claudia Schmidt (politician) (born 1963), Austrian politician and educator